James Reid (September 14, 1848 – June 18, 1926) was an Ontario farmer and political figure. He represented Addington in the Legislative Assembly of Ontario as a Conservative member from 1890 to 1904.

He was born in Camden Township, Canada West, in 1848, the son of Irish immigrants and was educated there. In 1877, he married Elizabeth Harkness. Reid was a member of the council for Camden, serving as reeve and warden for Lennox and Addington Counties. He lived near Centreville.

External links 
The Canadian parliamentary companion, 1891 JA Gemmill

1848 births
1926 deaths
Progressive Conservative Party of Ontario MPPs